Tākou Bay is a bay and rural community in the Far North District and Northland Region of New Zealand's North Island.

The local Tākou Marae is a meeting place for the Ngāpuhi hapū of Ngāti Tautahi, Ngāti Tūpango and Ngāti Whakaeke, and the Ngāpuhi and Ngāpuhi / Ngāti Kahu ki Whaingaroa hapū of Ngāti Rēhia. It includes Te Whetū Marama meeting house.

References

Far North District
Populated places in the Northland Region